Anna Barbarzak (born 21 June 1978) is a Polish civil servant and diplomat, serving as an ambassador to Greece (2015–2019).

Education 
Barbarzak studied international economic relations at the SGH Warsaw School of Economics. She was studying also international security at the Geneva Centre for Security Policy.

Career
In 2001, she began her career at the Ministry of Foreign Affairs. Between 2006 and 2007 she was working as a Third Secretary at the Permanent Mission of the Republic of Poland to the United Nations Office in Geneva. From 2007 to 2011 she was Second and First Secretary at the Embassy in Washington, being responsible for economic, climate and energy issues. Afterwards, she was heading the unit at the Minister's secretary. In 2013, she became deputy director, and later director of the Department of Economic Cooperation, being in charge of, among other, coordinating cooperation with OECD, IMF, UNCTAD, EBRD, EIB.

In October 2015, Barbarzak was nominated Poland ambassador to Greece. She presented her letter of credence on 21 January 2016. She ended her term in 2019.

Personal life
Besides Polish, Barbarzak speaks English and Russian languages. She is married to Wojciech Flera.

References 

1978 births
Ambassadors of Poland to Greece
Living people
SGH Warsaw School of Economics alumni
Polish women ambassadors